Bahlil Lahadalia (born 7 August 1976) is an Indonesian businessman and politician. He has been serving as Minister of Investment since April 2021, dual-hatted as head of the Indonesian Investment Coordinating Board (BKPM), which he had served since October 2019. He has also served as Minister of Energy and Mineral Resources ad interim since 3 February 2022.

Early life and education 
He was born in and had most of his education in Maluku, from elementary to junior high school before moving to Fak-Fak,( where his father is from) to take high school. He decided to study economics in Jayapura at Port Numbay Economy College, a local private college. However, as he revealed during a guest lecture in University of Brawijaya, he graduated very late at age of 26 years old, as his education was interrupted due to his involvement in the May 1998 riots.

During his time as a student, he was active in the Muslim Students' Association in Papua, and he eventually reached the position of General Treasurer of the National Leadership of the Muslim Students' Association.

Early and businesses careers 
His first job was as a cake seller when he was a pre-teen. He later became a bus conductor when he was just a teenager, and eventually became a public transportation driver when he was in senior high school. Years later, after he had graduated from Port Numbay, he was hired as a worker of Sucofindo, a state-run company. With his friends, he later founded three companies named PT Rifa Capital, PT Bersama Papua Unggul, and PT Dwijati Sukses.

He owns PT Rifa Capital Holding Company and 10 other companies, and is active mostly in the transportation and property sectors.

He is a former chairman of the Indonesian Young Entrepreneurs Association.

As a businessman, at some point in time, he met Joko Widodo who was a fellow businessman at that time and befriended him. The friendship they shared was very close to the point Joko Widodo himself considered him a brother.

Governmental careers 
During 2019 Indonesian presidential election, Lahadalia supported Joko Widodo for his run for second term of his presidency. He became Director of Directorate for Young Voters Raiser of the Joko Widodo - Ma'ruf Amin presidential campaign team, National Campaign Team of the Working Indonesia Coalition. For his work for Joko Widodo campaign in defending his presidency, in October 2019, he was appointed head of BKPM (Indonesian: Badan Koordinasi Penanaman Modal, English: Indonesia Investment Coordinating Board). He was sworn in as Indonesia's first minister of investment on 28 April 2021, following the creation of the Ministry of Investment.

On 4 February 2022, Arifin Tasrif, the Minister of Energy and Mineral Resources suddenly replaced with Lahadalia as ad interim minister for undisclosed health-related issue reason. The change is effective from 3 February 2022. It later revealed that Tasrif is infected with COVID-19, and the change of the ministry is just temporary.

References 

1976 births
Living people
Indonesian politicians
People from Maluku (province)